Minor league baseball teams were based in Ottawa, Illinois in various seasons between 1890 and 1915. Ottawa minor league teams played as members of the Illinois-Iowa League in 1890 and 1891, Illinois-Missouri League in 1914 and the Bi-State League in 1915. Ottawa hosted home minor league games at Lincoln–Douglas Park.

History
Minor league baseball began with the 1890 Ottawa Pirates, who played as charter members of the eight–team Illinois-Iowa League, an Independent league. Ottawa ended the 1890 season with a record of 58–50, placing 4th in the Illinois–Iowa League, while playing under managers James Hillery, William Sinon and Bert Merrifield. The Pirates finished 8.5 games behind the 1st place Ottumwa Coal Palace Kings in the final standings.

The Ottawa Modocs continued play in the eight–team 1891 Illinois–Iowa League League. The Modocs ended the 1891 season with a record of 53–49, placing 4th in the Illinois–Iowa League standings under manager Jack Remsen, 13.0 games behind 1st place Quincy. However, the Ottumwa Coal Palaces, Cedar Rapids Canaries, Davenport Pilgrims and Aurora Maroons franchises all folded before the season concluded, leaving the league with just four teams. The Quincy Ravens (65–35), Joliet Giants (62–48) and Rockford Hustlers (54–46) finished ahead of the Modocs in the final standings. The Ottawa franchisee did not return to the 1892 Illinois-Iowa League.

After a hiatus, minor league baseball returned to Ottawa in 1914. The Ottawa Indians became members of the six–team Class D level Illinois–Missouri League. The Indians finished the 1914 season with a record of 47–38, placing 2nd in the Illinois–Missouri League, 13.0 games behind the 1st place Champaign Velvets. Chuck Fleming served as manager. Ottawa finished in the final standings with Champaign-Urbana Velvets (62–27), Streator Boosters (40–48) and LaSalle Blue Sox (26–60). The Kankakee Kanks (14–33) and Lincoln Abes (32–15) both folded from the league on July 3, 1914, and the Illinois-Missouri League permanently folded after the 1914 season.

The Ottawa Indians continued play in a new league in 1915 and were the final Ottawa minor league team. Ottawa became charter members of the 1915 the Bi-State League, which formed as a Class D level league. The league permanently folded on July 7, 1915, during its first season of play. Ottawa ended the 1915 season with a record of 20–35 and were 6th in the Bi–State League standings when the league folded. Louis Ehrgott served as manager, as Ottawa finished in the standings with the Aurora Foxes (25–27), Elgin Watch Makers (27–26), Freeport Pretzels (23–29), Racine Belles (30–20) and Streator Boosters (30–18). The Bi-State League folded after the 1915 season.

Ottawa, Illinois has not hosted another minor league team.

The ballpark
Ottawa teams were noted to have played minor league home games at Lincoln–Douglas Park. The park was named for Ottawa being the site of the first of the 1858 Lincoln–Douglas debates, held at Washington Square Park. Washington Park is on the National Register of Historic Places. Today, the site has historical markers and is located at East 600 Utica Drive, Ottawa, Illinois.

Timeline

Year–by–year records

Notable alumni

Fritz Clausen (1890)
Bill Geiss (1890–1891)
Charlie Gray (1890)
Frank Hankinson (1891)
Charlie Jaeger (1914)
Ed Keas (1891)
Henry Killeen (1891)
George Lyons (1914–1915)
Jack Remsen (1891, MGR)
Joe Wright (1890)

See also
Ottawa Indians playersOttawa Modocs players

References

External links
Baseball Reference

Ottawa, Illinois
LaSalle County, Illinois